Zaraqan (also Romanized as Zaraqān and Zarqān; also known as Zaraghan, Zaraq, and Zarghan) is a village in Khorram Dasht Rural District, in the Central District of Famenin County, Hamadan Province, Iran. At the 2006 census, its population was 1,079, in 275 families.

References 

Populated places in Famenin County